Broderbund was a large American software developer and publisher most active in the 1980s and the 1990s. Though most of their products were video games, they also published a number of home productivity software titles.

"XBLA" is the Xbox Live Arcade
"Win3X" traditionally refers to the operating system "Windows 3.1x" Windows 3.1x but may also refer to Windows 3.0, Windows NT 3.1, Windows NT 3.5 or Windows NT 3.51; see also: Windows 3.x
"Win9X" traditionally refers to the operating system families "Windows 95" and "Windows 98"

See also
Red Orb Entertainment — Broderbund's game publishing division

References

Broderbund products
 
Broderbund